Hans Ingi Hedemark (September 21, 1875 – June 21, 1940) was a Norwegian opera singer (a tenor) and an actor.

Career
Hans Ingi Hedemark made his debut at the Christiania Theater in 1896 in Otto Sinding's play Iraka. Hedemark was engaged with the national Theater in Bergen in 1899 as both an opera singer and a character actor. He recorded 78 rpm records on the Gramophone label for Brødrene Johnsen A/S. Hedemark also appeared in film roles.

Opera roles (selected)

1901: La belle Hélène as Pâris
1902: La bohème as Rodolpho
1902: Les dragons de Villars as Sylvain
1902: Le postillon de Lonjumeau as Chapelou
1903: Kynthia as Agaton
1904: La fille du régiment as Tonio

Filmography

1911: Bondefangeri i Vaterland as  Ola Snippen
1911: Fattigdommens forbandelse
1911: Under forvandlingens lov as a singer
1917: De Forældreløse as Sam the boatman
1918: Lodsens datter as the pilot
1919: Æresgjesten as Robert, Klara James's son
1919: Historien om en gut as the boatman

References

External links
 
 Hans Ingi Hedemark at Filmfront

1875 births
1940 deaths
19th-century Norwegian male actors
20th-century Norwegian male actors
Male actors from Oslo
20th-century Norwegian male opera singers
Tenors